Ross River is an unincorporated community in Yukon, Canada. It lies at the junction of the Ross River and the Pelly River, along the Canol Road, not far from the Campbell Highway. Primary access to the Campbell Highway is via a nine-mile access road. Formerly it was accessed along a six-mile Canol Road section that is no longer maintained. It is serviced by Ross River Airport, used mainly for charter and scheduled flights to and from Whitehorse and Watson Lake.

It is the home of the Ross River Dena Council, a First Nation in eastern Yukon.

History 
The confluence of the Ross and Pelly rivers had long been used as a gathering place for First Nation peoples, particularly in the late summer. The first permanent settlement was established in 1901 when Tom Smith started a small fur trading post on the north bank of the Pelly and called the spot Smiths Landing. That winter approximately 15 First Nation families overwintered near the post, creating the beginnings of the permanent community of Ross River. By 1903 a second, rival trading post was set up on the south bank of the Pelly opposite Smiths Landing. The settlement attracted an increasing number of people, mostly the Kaska but including many First Nation people from the Mackenzie River region who would travel over the divide to meet others, trade, and sometimes stay. By 1914 over 1,000 people were gathering at Ross River in the late summer. But a severe influenza epidemic in 1916 hit the community's First Nation people hard, and increasing economic activity and new trading posts along the Mackenzie River reduced the population.

World War II and the years immediately following brought massive changes to Ross River. The building of the Canol Road and pipeline between 1942 and 1944 brought a massive, but temporary, influx of newcomers and the new road made the community more accessible, although the road closed in 1946 and did not reopen until 1958. The late 1940s and early 1950s also saw a collapse of fur prices and the permanent closure of most of the region's fur trading posts — including Pelly Banks, Sheldon Lake, Rose Point, Frances Lake and Macmillan River. By 1952 Ross River had the only remaining trading post in the region. The Canol Road shifted the commercial centre of the community to the south bank of the Pelly River at the new ferry crossing point and the federal government began pressuring the First Nation to move across the river from the Old Village. By the mid 1960s the community of Ross River assumed the shape it has today.

Geography

Climate 
Ross River has subarctic climate (Dfc) with long, severely cold winters and short but mild summers.

Demographics 

Economy 
Mining exploration increased in the region around Ross River through the 1950s and an exploration and mining boom occurred in the 1960s and 1970s with the discovery and development of the Faro mine.

In 1950 and 1951 Al Kulan, who was inducted into the Canadian Mining Hall of Fame in 2005, prospected the Pelly Range. In 1952 he located mineralization in the Anvil district. In 1953 Ross River Dena citizen Jack Sterriah mentioned a heavy concentration of rust in Vangorda Creek that he had known about as a boy. That year Kulan, Peter Thompson along with Dena citizens Arthur John, China Sterriah, Jack Ladue and Robert Etzel prospected Vangorda Creek and found the first significant mineralization in the area on July 2. They, along with Dena members Joe Etzel and Jack Steriah, were issued shares in the company formed as a result of the discovery, Vangorda Mines Ltd. The property was optioned to Prospectors Airways, headquartered in Toronto.

Arthur John, a Dena elder, learned prospecting from, and worked with, Kulan in the early 1950s and his fluency in English enabled him to serve as an intermediary between Kulan and other Ross River Dena members who also learned to identify minerals. John had a long career prospecting with Conwest Exploration as well as Kulan's companies Spartan Exploration and Welcome North Mines.

From 1954 to 1957 Kulan prospected north-west of the Vangorda and discovered a rusty area. Geochemical and geophysical surveys resulted in several drill targets. Propspectors Airways would only pay for a packsack drill. The first drill hole was attempted over the No. 2 orebody of what, a decade later, would become Canada's largest lead-zinc mine. This hole could not reach the bedrock due to heavy overburden. The program was discontinued. In 1964 the property was re-staked by Dynasty Explorations which Kulan was a director and officer of. Dynasty staked large tracts of the district and identified many drill targets. Due to lack of funds they joined forces with Cyprus Mines Corporation of Los Angeles. The joint venture was running over budget when a move was made to one of the mineralized sites selected by Kulan, which was one of the last hopes for the discovery of a successful body of ore. In the summer of 1965 the discovery of the mine was made and resulted in the biggest staking rush the Yukon Territory had ever seen. The mine closed permanently in 1997.

Media 
The Ross River community was too small to get a satellite-serviced transmitter for CBC and did not even have radio – residents would drive to Faro to listen to the Canada-Russia hockey series. The first television service arrived after intervention from Al Kulan, who hired a helicopter and pilot from Whitehorse and flew from mountaintop to mountaintop on a bitterly cold night to find the signal from Faro's five watt TV transmitter. After a signal was detected on Grew Creek Hill, Kulan paid for the equipment, and the community's men volunteered their work, bulldozing a road up the mountain. The transmitter caught the government's attention, but the residents steadfastly refused to shut it down and requested a licence. In early 1975, radio was finally installed. Ross River's community effort led to other similar projects that brought TV to every community; Teslin installed their own satellite dish (illegal until 1979), and the Yukon government attempted to negotiate a lower lease price with Telesat Canada which had a monopoly on satellite earth stations until 1979.

See also
 Ross River Airport
 Kudz Ze Kayah mine, a proposed mine near the river

References

External links
Community profile
Ross River website
The Ross River Dena: A Yukon Aboriginal Economy (PDF)

Settlements in Yukon